Jérémy Grimm (born 27 March 1987) is a French professional footballer who plays as a central midfielder for Colmar.

Club career
On 2 February 2021, he returned to Colmar.

References

1987 births
Living people
French footballers
Association football midfielders
RC Strasbourg Alsace players
SR Delémont players
SR Colmar players
Swiss Challenge League players
Ligue 1 players
Ligue 2 players
Championnat National players
Championnat National 3 players
French expatriate footballers
Expatriate footballers in Switzerland
French expatriate sportspeople in Switzerland